Adela Catherine Breton (31 December 1849 – June 1923) was an English archaeological artist and explorer. She made watercolour copies of the wall paintings of Mexican temples, notably those of the Upper Temple of Jaguars at Chichen Itza.

Biography
Breton was born in London on 31 December 1849, to parents who were widely travelled. Her English father served in the Royal Navy and met Adela's mother (who was born in Somerset, England) while in Tasmania. They moved to Bath, Somerset, a few months after Adela's birth and she grew up there. During her childhood the family spent time travelling through Europe, visiting France, Switzerland and Italy. Adela probably studied art while staying in Florence. With much of her time spent in Bath, with its Roman remains, the Bretons took a keen interest in the archaeology. She stayed in Bath to look after her parents in their old age but, after her father died in 1887, she decided to travel. She made a conscious decision not to marry, so she could remain independent and satisfy her wanderlust. She initially headed for Canada (and the United States) where she painted the landscape, before returning to Bath to hold an exhibition of her paintings. In 1892 she made her first visit to Mexico. She hired a local guide, Pablo Solario.

Her time in Mexico was spent travelling on horseback across the country, using her artistic skills to record the friezes, carvings and other archaeological treasures that were being unearthed in the Yucatán. Her first trip lasted 18 months, when she travelled continually making notes and sketches. As the 1890s passed, Breton spent less time on return visits to England and more time on her travels in Mexico. Her observations became more scientific and broadened to include the geology, the canyons and volcanoes. However, she is particularly known for her colour paintings of the frescos discovered at Teotihuacan in 1894, at a site that became known as Teopancaxco.

Breton's travels in Mexico were eventually curtailed by the Mexican revolution in 1910. She was recognised internationally in her lifetime for her valuable contribution to Mesoamerican archaeology.

She died in Barbados in 1923 aged 73.

Legacy
A collection of her work is held in Bristol Museum & Art Gallery, where a digitisation project was started in 2014 so that the fragile rolls of paintings can be preserved and made available for research.

Some of her correspondence with Ella Lewis of Philadelphia is held in Harvard University Library.

In 2016 a four-month exhibition entitled "The Remarkable Miss Breton" was held at the Bath Royal Literary & Scientific Institution in Bath. In 2017 an exhibition of her original work was held at the Bristol Museum & Art Gallery.

References

Sources

Further reading

Sparrow-Niang, Jane (2017). "The Remarkable Miss Breton: artist, archaeologist, traveller". Bath Royal Literary and Scientific Institution.
 

1849 births
1923 deaths
20th-century British archaeologists
20th-century English painters
20th-century English women artists
20th-century English women writers
Artists from Bath, Somerset
British women archaeologists
English archaeologists
English watercolourists
English women painters
Women watercolorists